Kadıköy  is a village in Mut district of  Mersin Province, Turkey. At  its situated at the west bank of  Göksu River. The bridge  over the river which connects the villages to the west of Mut to Mut is also called Kadıköy bridge. The population of Kadıköy was 314  as of 2012. Main economic activity is agriculture and animal husbandry. Main crops are various fruits.

References

Villages in Mut District